Guy Rouxel (24 January 1926 – 18 April 2016) was a French footballer. He competed in the men's tournament at the 1948 Summer Olympics.

References

External links
 

1926 births
2016 deaths
French footballers
Olympic footballers of France
Footballers at the 1948 Summer Olympics
Place of birth missing
Association football goalkeepers
Sportspeople from Saint-Brieuc
Footballers from Brittany
Stade Rennais F.C. players
Toulouse FC (1937) players
Grenoble Foot 38 players
Stade Briochin players